Sheila Salas (born 28 January 1993) is a Cuban handball player. She plays for the club Matanzas and is member of the Cuban national team. She competed at the 2015 World Women's Handball Championship in Denmark.

References

1993 births
Living people
Cuban female handball players
21st-century Cuban women